"No One Else" is a song by Total, from their 1996 debut album. The track was a collaboration between the group's record label owner Sean "Puffy" Combs, now infamous member of the Trackmasters Jean-Claude "Poke" Olivier and Terri & Monica vocalist/writer Terri Robinson. It featured a rap verse from Da Brat, a sample from the track "South Bronx" by KRS-One/Boogie Down Productions and was a top 40 hit, peaking at number twenty-two on the U.S. Billboard Hot 100 and faring even better at number four on the Hot R&B/Hip-Hop Songs chart.

The song was released with both the original and Puff Daddy (& Rodney Jerkins) Remix as prominent versions. Certain editions of the single only featured the remix and it even had its own music video. The track was based around rap verses from Foxy Brown and Lil' Kim, a new one from original featured artist Da Brat and a re-written chorus of "I don't need no one but you" by Total. The video version also had Puff Daddy recite lyrics from Sister Sledge's "We Are Family" (in reference to the Bad Boy Family) during the intro.

The mellow R&B Remix by another Bad Boy associate, producer Chucky Thompson was also included on certain editions of the single. There were slight lyrical differences on this mix including no rap, a spoken intro by Keisha, repositioning of the bridge and Keisha & Pam this time providing background vocals to their respective B-Sections.

Music video
There were videos filmed for both "No One Else" and its "Puff Daddy Remix":
The original version features members of the group in several different outfits including one set resembling biker gear with background colours of white, red, green and gold. Shots from the video were used as promotional pictures for the "No One Else", "Kissin' You" and "What About Us?" singles and the groups' debut album. Da Brat makes an appearance rapping her contribution to the track in a scene with a white convertible car, green background and all artists dressed in white outfits. Director Hype Williams helmed this video.

The remix video is slightly more concept based, with the women eventually arriving to rob a bank in a Mercedes Benz car. The various artists appearing on the track also feature alongside Puff Daddy & The Notorious B.I.G. against a white background and playing poker. It is viewed completely in black and white and was to be the group's second of three single remix videos. (the other two being "Can't You See" & "Kissin' You")

Track listings
CD single (remix)

 Puff Daddy remix
 R&B remix
 R&B remix instrumental
 Puff Daddy remix instrumental

12" vinyl single (US)

Side 1
 Club version
 Club version 2
 R&B mix
Side 2
 Radio edit
 Radio edit 2
 Instrumental

12" vinyl single (remix)

Side 1
 Puff Daddy remix
 Puff Daddy remix 2
 R&B remix instrumental
Side 2
 Puff Daddy remix radio edit
 R&B remix
 Puff Daddy remix instrumental

Trivia
 Writer of the track, Terri Robinson, also wrote the group's debut single "Can't You See".
 The "Puff Daddy Remix" is widely known as the only musical appearance of now-rivals Lil' Kim and Foxy Brown together, who were at the time, best friends and associates of the Bad Boy label. Though they both appear in the remix video, they never appear together in the video.
 Producer Poke later re-used the KRS-One/Boogie Down Productions "South Bronx" sample when working as one half of the Trackmasters on Jennifer Lopez' 2002 single "Jenny from the Block". Lopez is also the other producer of the track, Sean "Puffy" Combs' former girlfriend.
 Although it was Puff Daddy who recited a small section of "We Are Family" on the "Puff Daddy Remix", Total later sang an interpretation of another Sister Sledge hit "He's the Greatest Dancer" while appearing on Tony Touch's single "(I Wonder Why) He's The Greatest DJ".

Charts

Weekly charts

Year-end charts

References

1996 singles
Total (group) songs
Bad Boy Records singles
Songs written by Sean Combs
Songs written by Da Brat
Music videos directed by Hype Williams
1995 songs
Songs written by Jean-Claude Olivier